There are four national trade union centers in Turkey. The oldest and largest is the Confederation of Turkish Trade Unions (TÜRK-İŞ). 

 Confederation of Turkish Trade Unions (TÜRK-İŞ, founded 1952, 1.75m members)
 Confederation of Revolutionary Trade Unions of Turkey (DİSK, founded 1967, 327,000 members)
 Confederation of Turkish Real Trade Unions (HAK-İŞ, founded 1976, 340,000 members)
 Confederation of Public Workers' Unions (KESK, founded 1995, 300,000 members)

Some unions, such as the KESK-affiliated education union Eğitim-Sen, have witnessed repeated attempts on banning and member imprisonment.

See also

 Turkish labour law

 
Law of Turkey